Abdul Taib bin Mahmud (Jawi: عبدالطيب بن محمود; born 21 May 1936) is a Malaysian politician who has served as the 7th Yang di-Pertua Negeri of Sarawak since March 2014. He served as the 4th Chief Minister of Sarawak for 33 years, from March 1981 to February 2014, making him the longest-serving head of government of a Malaysian state. He served as President of the Parti Pesaka Bumiputera Bersatu (PBB), which was part of the Barisan Nasional coalition until 2018. He is of ethnic Melanau descent.

Taib is informally known as Pak Uban, which translates into "White-haired Uncle". Among Chinese speaking communities he is known as Pek Moh (Tâi-lô: Pe̍h-moo) which means "white hair". Another informal name for him, in reference to the British Brooke family that ruled Sarawak as White Rajahs in the 19th and early 20th century, is the "last white rajah" or "white-haired rajah". Holding the post of Chief Minister of Sarawak from 1981 to 2014, he is the longest serving Chief Minister in Malaysia. He assumed the Chief Minister post at the age of 45. Being a member of the Malaysian Parliament (MP) for 38 years, Taib is also the second longest-serving parliamentarian in Malaysia after Tengku Razaleigh Hamzah. Taib and his wider family are regularly accused of corruption and personally benefiting from Sarawak's natural and economic resources.

On 12 February 2014, Taib handed over his resignation letter to the Governor of Sarawak to vacate his chief minister post, officially ending his 33 years of chief ministership. His former brother-in-law, Adenan Satem,  succeeded him as Chief Minister with effect from 1 March 2014. At the same time, he received the official credentials as the 7th Sarawak Head of State from the Yang di-Pertuan Agong at Istana Negara on 28 February, and officially took the oath of office on the following day. He became the second Sarawakian (after his uncle, Abdul Rahman Ya'kub) to be appointed as the Governor after formally relinquishing the post of Chief Minister.

Early life and education
Taib Mahmud was born on 21 May 1936 at Kampung Sungei Merbau, Miri, Sarawak. He is the eldest child of Mahmud bin Haji Abang Yahya (father) and Hajjah Hamidah binti Yakub (mother). Taib has nine siblings namely Ibrahim, Onn, Mohammad Ali, Mohammad Arip, Mohammad Tufail, Aisah Zainab, Roziah, Faridah Hanon and Zaleha. Taib's father was a descendant of Pehin Datu Yahya Setia Raja, where the latter was an aristocrat that was linked to the Royal Court of Brunei. However, Taib had an impoverished life because his father worked as a carpenter for Shell Oil Company. Taib's uncle, Abdul Rahman Ya'kub raised Taib since he was a boy.

Taib was five years old when the Japanese army landed in Miri in 1941. Taib's father, considering his family's safety from Japanese occupation, decided to move his family to his ancestral village in Mukah. After the war ended, the family returned to Miri. Taib undertook his early schooling at Andi Malay School and later St Joseph's Primary School in Miri. Taib later won a Shell scholarship to study at St. Joseph's Secondary School in Kuching with the help of his uncle, Abdul Rahman who was also a Probationary Native Officer in Miri. There, Taib met George Chan Hong Nam who would later become the deputy chief minister of Sarawak and Bujang bin Mohammed Nor who would later become Sarawak state secretary under the Taib's chieftainship.

After school, Taib Mahmud planned to become a doctor but he was persuaded by Abdul Rahman to take up law. According to Taib:

In 1958, his excellent performance in the Higher School Certificate (HSC) examination earned him a Colombo Plan scholarship, allowing Taib to further his studies at the University of Adelaide in South Australia. He graduated with Bachelor of Laws degree from the university in 1960. After graduation, he was appointed as an associate to Justice Sir Herbert Mayo of the Supreme Court of South Australia. After the demise of his father, Taib took up the responsibility to look after his siblings and to discipline his siblings in studies and in looking after the household. Taib Mahmud pursued his postgraduate studies at Harvard International Summer Course in 1964.

Early political career
On returning to Sarawak, Taib worked in the Crown Council from 1962 to 1963. He was then persuaded by his uncle to take part in the formation of Barisan Ra'ayat Jati Sarawak (BARJASA) party. Taib resigned from Crown Council and assumed the post of vice-chairman of BARJASA in 1963. In the 1963 local council elections, Taib's BARJASA party won only 44 out of 429 seats. Taib's uncle was defeated in the election. Sarawak National Party (SNAP) became a majority party with Stephen Kalong Ningkan as the state's first chief minister. However, Taib was able to join the Council Negri of Sarawak (now Sarawak State Legislative Assembly) on 22 July 1963, where he was appointed state minister for Communication and Works from 1963 to 1966 although Taib did not contest in the election. In Taib's own words, he said that:

1966 Sarawak constitutional crisis

Although Taib was a minister in the Sarawak cabinet with a superior education background, he was frustrated when his BARJASA party was consulted last after expatriate, SNAP party, and Sarawak Chinese Association (SCA) were consulted in a cabinet decision making. Taib's anger towards Ningkan's leadership intensified in 1965 when Ningkan decided to pass a land bill which would allow Chinese to purchase native land. BARJASA party later formed an alliance with Parti Negara Sarawak (PANAS), and Parti Pesaka Sarawak (PESAKA) in order to challenge Ningkan. Taib and another BARJASA leader Awang Hipni was expelled from Sarawak cabinet by Ningkan. In June 1966, Taib and his BARJASA partner was re-accepted into the cabinet in order to end the ruling coalition crisis. However, the crisis between SNAP and BARJASA worsened into a constitutional crisis and Ningkan was removed as chief minister in 1966.

Appointment to minister in federal cabinet
Taib later became Minister of Development and Forestry in 1967 under the leadership of new Sarawak chief minister Tawi Sli. On several occasions, Taib acted as Chief Minister. Taib later fall out with Tawi Sli. Taib decided to shift his focus onto the Malaysian federal cabinet. Taib was appointed Federal Assistant Minister for Commerce and Industry from 1968 until 1970. He represented Parti Bumiputera Sarawak, which was a component party of Sarawak Alliance, in 1969 Malaysian general election. During the 1970 parliamentary election for Sarawak, he was elected as the member of Malaysian parliament for Kota Samarahan seat. He was later appointed to numerous portfolios including Deputy Minister in the Prime Minister's Department (1970–1972) and Natural Resources Minister (1972–1974). In 1973, Taib was appointed deputy president of the newly formed PBB before subsequently becoming the president of the party. Abdul Rahman Ya'kub was Taib's political mentor for 20 years. In 1980, Taib was appointed as federal territory minister which would be the Taib's last portfolio before he returned to Sarawak. During this time, Taib was able to develop a good relationship with Mahathir Mohamad, who would later become Malaysian fourth prime minister. Taib stepped down from federal cabinet post on 9 March 1981.

Appointment as Chief Minister
In order to let Taib to become an elected representative in Sarawak state assembly, a PBB assembly woman vacated the Sebandi (now Asajaya) seat and a by-election was held in March 1981. Taib won the seat unopposed. He was later appointed as Sarawak's Land and Mines Minister. On 26 March 1981, Taib's uncle, Abdul Rahman, who was the chief minister of Sarawak at that time, announced his retirement from politics by vacating his state constituency of Paloh and PBB presidency. However, the Malaysian federal government favoured the appointment of Sulaiman Daud as the next chief minister because Taib was away from Sarawak for 13 years. Abdul Rahman was able to convince the federal leaders to appoint Taib as chief minister because Daud was much more junior than Taib. Taib retained entire cabinet line-up of his uncle except for Celestine Ujang who would vacate his ministerial post to become speaker in the Sarawak state assembly. Daud would later fill the federal ministerial post left vacant by Taib.

Taib held the Sebandi seat until 1987, when he was elected as state assemblyman for the Asajaya constituency. In 2001 state election, he decided to contest in Balingian. Taib served in many public and voluntary bodies and represented the government at various international conferences.

1987 Ming Court Affair

Dissatisfaction with the Taib leadership arose when a group of PBB politicians claimed that the interests of Bumiputeras were being neglected. The group claimed Taib Mahmud had exclusively favoured the Chinese and Sarawak United Peoples' Party (SUPP). The Dayaks in the Sarawak Dayak People's Party (PBDS) were quite frustrated because the Chief Minister post has not been in their hands for 17 years. However, the main factor for upheaval in PBDS was the suspicion of Chief Minister Taib towards Leo Moggie, the PBDS president. According to a doctoral dissertation written by David Walter Brown, fissures between the factions controlled by Taib and his uncle, Tun Abdul Rahman Ya'kub gradually developed after Rahman Ya'kub stepped down as Chief Minister. In 1985, Rahman Ya'kub was also removed from the office of governor by Taib himself. This caused Rahman Ya'kub to launch a series of attacks against Taib in 1987, widely known as the Ming Court Affair.

Rahman Ya'kub headed a group of disappointed Sarawak politicians from Sarawak National Party (SNAP) and PBDS to gather in Ming Court Hotel in Kuala Lumpur to move a motion of no confidence against Taib's leadership by signing letters collectively. Daniel Tajem, a former deputy chief minister and Leo Moggie were the other main plotters of this affair. Seeing such a political crisis, Taib immediately called for a snap state election in 1987, which he narrowly won. His coalition won 28 out of 48 seats in the state assembly and later received another 8 defected assemblymen from PBDS, decreasing the original seats for PBDS from 15 to 7. PBDS remained in the opposition until it was readmitted into Sarawak BN in 1994. The internal bickering of SNAP and PBDS has benefited the rule of Taib in the years to come.

Development policy
 
Eco-tourism forms a major part of the economy of Sarawak. Taib's administration with the help of the Malaysian federal government, has made Sarawak's World Heritage more accessible through the construction of the Pan Borneo Highway. Manufacturing, industrial, and tourism sector are given special attention. High technology industries aimed to play a role into the economic expansion and creation of jobs in the state. As a result of Taib Mahmud's policy of development, Sarawak GDP growth exceeded national average in 1995. To balance the development between urban and rural areas, Taib Mahmud also endorsed town planning, natural resources planning, large-scale plantations, and native customary land (NCR) development. However, cases of exploitation of NCR lands for logging, mining, and plantation purposes have also been reported. Sarawak is the first state in Malaysia to fully implement the e-government initiative while the Sarawak State Library is the first e-library in Malaysia. Sarawak Corridor of Renewable Energy (SCORE) which was introduced in 2008, is aimed to diversify the future economy of Sarawak.

Since 1981, the Gross Domestic Product (GDP) has grown from RM 6.5 billion to RM 19.7 billion in 1995 and increased further to an estimated of RM 29.9 billion in 1999. In 1995, 31.9% of the population was living in poverty and 10% in hard-core poverty. By 1997, the incidence of poverty was down to 7.5% and hard-core poverty went down to 0.7%. In 1980, only 31.8% of people of Sarawak had water supply, but in 1995, the figure has reached 85% of the population.

But Sarawak's prosperity is not evenly shared across the socio-economic classes. Unlike the data above, academics and non-governmental organisations (NGOs) that are independent of Taib's PBB party revealed that the large disparity between urban and rural poverty remains a major challenge for Taib's three decades-old administration.

During his tenure, Taib has been able to disciplined the co-operation of leaders from different political parties to reach a common political consensus. Taib considered that his proudest achievements are in terms of economic development, social integration and industrialisation in Sarawak.

Environmental policy
The Sarawak government announced that they are stepping up their effort for wildlife conservation and protection. A programme has been put in place by Sarawak government to save the flora and fauna affected by the construction of the Bakun Dam.

Other programmes include the Heart 2 Heart orangutan campaign which invites the public to get involved with orangutan conservation; orang-utan and turtle adoption; protection of the dugong and the Irrawaddy dolphin, which are both endangered species; and the Reef Ball project that will rehabilitate Sarawak's ocean ecosystem by placing artificial reef modules in the sea to form new habitats.

In 1992, International Tropical Timber Organization (ITTO) also financed the establishment of Lanjak Entimau Wildlife Sanctuary which now houses about 4000 orang utan. This wildlife century also aimed to improve the livelihood of the rural population and to reduce their dependence on forests.

2030 vision for Sarawak

During the celebrations of Taib's 28th year in power as the chief minister of Sarawak, speaking at Dewan Suarah Bintulu Taib said that his vision for Sarawak was for it to become the richest state in Malaysia by the year 2030. It is the intention of Taib and his administration to develop more high-skilled jobs.

To achieve this, the state is investing money in developing new higher education institutions. This policy is intended to help move the economy away from industry which relies heavily on Sarawak's natural resources to a more skilled, serviced-based economy.

Sarawak Cabinet reshuffle

Taib announced his cabinet reshuffle on 8 November 2009. Six new state assemblymen were appointed as assistant ministers, while the portfolios of others were changed. Five out of the six new appointees were sworn in on 21 November 2009 before the state governor, Tun Datuk Patinggi Abang Muhamad Salahuddin in the state assembly. The remaining assistant minister, Abdul Wahab Aziz, was on a pilgrimage. The new cabinet line-up took effect on 1 December 2009.

Taib, who retained the Finance, and Planning and Resource Management Minister portfolios, said the reorganisation was meant to prepare Sarawak for new development policies and approaches that could take place some time in the 10th Malaysia Plan (10MP) or after the next state election. He also said that with the Sarawak Corridor of Renewable Energy (SCORE) coming up, he would reform Syarikat SESCO Berhad (SESCO) in the next one or two years.

On 28 September 2011, Taib again announced another cabinet reshuffle with the appointment of Senior Ministers in the cabinet and renaming several ministries. Taib also created new ministries that will focused on the welfare, women and family development.

2011 state election and aftermath
Despite being the target of an onslaught of attacks by the opposition Pakatan Rakyat coalition, Taib led PBB to a clean sweep of seats contested in the 2011 state election, winning an eighth consecutive term as chief minister. However, the Barisan Nasional coalition suffered its worst performance ever in a Sarawak state election, with coalition partner Sarawak United People's Party (SUPP) suffering badly due to his poor standing among the Chinese community. Following the election, he was under pressure from the BN national leadership to step down to avoid hurting BN's prospects during the next general election. Despite this, Taib remained vague about his retirement plans.

Appointment as Governor of Sarawak
After resigning as chief minister, Taib Mahmud was appointed as the seventh Governor of Sarawak on 1 March 2014. Following this appointment, Taib was bestowed title "Tun" on 26 May 2014. He was re-appointed as Governor on 28 February 2018 and again on 28 February 2022.

Controversies

Taib Mahmud has been accused of being responsible for the environmental destruction that took place in Sarawak during his tenure as chief minister. This Swiss environmentalist, Bruno Manser, held Taib "personally responsible" for the destruction of Sarawak rainforests.

Taib Mahmud was noted to rely on a patronage system to reward "compliant local leaders" and stifle potential opposition. He and his relatives were "widely thought to extract a percentage from most major commercial contracts – including those for logging – awarded in the state (Sarawak)" according to a series of leaked US embassy cables published in August 2011. Taib Mahmud was reported to have tight control over logging industry. This enabled him to use timber concessions for personal and family enrichment. He had contributed for accelerating the pace of logging in Sarawak. Taib was alleged to favour his family members in various business appointments in Sarawak. The companies which have relationships with the chief minister's family such as Cahya Mata Sarawak Berhad (CMSB), Naim Holdings Berhad, Sarawak Energy, Ta Ann, and Titanium Management Sdn Bhd has benefited from various state contracts, concessions, and land dealings.

However, Taib Mahmud said that he did not ask anybody to do his sons a favour for the positions in CMSB and other companies. He also insisted that his family made money through their own hard work. His cabinet minister, in an interview with Al Jazeera English, maintained that the contracts were awarded transparently either in open or closed tenders. He said that the state government gave the contracts based on the previous good track record of the companies, not because of the alleged political connections. As of February 2014, Malaysian Anti-Corruption Commission (MACC) has found no evidence that Taib had abuse his political office for corruption because approval of land and logging areas were made by Taib's senior ministers or the Sarawak cabinet rather than Taib himself. This is in accordance with Section 23 of the Malaysian Anti-Corruption Commission Act 2009 where a person cannot be charged for corruption if there is no evidence that he has personally made the decision to award a contract to himself, relatives, or associates. In 2019, Pakatan Harapan law minister Liew Vui Keong stated that was no new evidence for MACC to reopen its investigations against Taib.

The University of Adelaide had a plaza named after him. His name was later removed because of what he did.

Personal life

Family
Taib wed 18-year-old Laila Taib, a Polish Muslim of Lipka Tatar origin, at South Australia's Adelaide mosque on 13 January 1959. On 29 April 2009, Taib's wife Laila died of cancer. She was buried at the Demak Jaya cemetery in Kuching the following day.

Taib's mother Hajah Hamidah Yakub died in Normah Specialist Medical Centre, Kuching due to old age at 90 years old when Taib Mahmud was hospitalised in Singapore and underwent surgery to remove a suspected cancerous lump in his colon on 11 January 2006. Taib's son Sulaiman Abdul Rahman is married to Anisa, who is the daughter of Deputy Chief Minister of Sarawak Datuk Patinggi Tan Sri Dr George Chan Hong Nam. His daughter, Jamilah Taib Murray and husband Sean Murray are involved in Sakto property development in Ottawa, Ontario, Canada. In 2009, Taib's four-year-old granddaughter Celestia Lulua Mahmud Abu Bekir died two days after slipping into the swimming pool at her home at Duta Nusantara Condominium in Kuala Lumpur.

On 18 December 2010, at the age of 74, he married again for the second time to Ragad Waleed Alkurdi, a Syrian-born woman and widow in her early 30s; however the wedding ceremony was held in private, attended only by his family members and 200 invited guests. On 8 January 2011, he was seen together with his new wife, attending a wedding reception of a former MP in Kuala Lumpur. Both held a wedding reception sometime in the middle of January, and the reception were held at the New Sarawak State Legislative Building Complex.

In 2016, the National Registration Department (NRD) was questioned for their decision to have speed up Ragad Waleed Alkurdi's citizenship approval in an absurd 'record' time of just six years, while permanent residents and undocumented Sarawak natives normally would have waited for decades for the same privilege. In 2018, Ragad Kurdi Taib, along with her two children from her first marriage, have been fast-tracked into fully fledged Melanaus and accorded native bumiputera status in the state led to many Sarawakians outrage.

Wealth

Taib owns a mansion in Demak Jaya which overlooks the Sarawak River. According to photos in the July to December 2006 newsletter of Naim Cendera Holdings Bhd, Taib's living room is decorated with gilt-edged European-style sofa sets. He also wears a ring with walnut-sized red gem surrounded by small diamonds. Laila Taib and her children are the majority shareholders of Sitehost Pty. Ltd., Australia, which owns Adelaide Hilton Hotel. Taib was described as "flamboyant with expensive tastes", an avid collector of Southeast Asian betel nut paraphernalia.  Taib's daughter Jamilah and family members has been establishing real property estates in Canada, United States, and United Kingdom. Taib Mahmud admitted that his daughter owns properties in Canada and London but he denied that he has any business interests in his daughter's properties.

Bruno Manser Fonds has since disclosed that Taib and his immediate family (his children, siblings and cousin Hamed Sepawi) have shares in more than 330 companies in Malaysia alone and more than 400 companies in total around the globe worth several billion US dollars. In September 2012, Bruno Manser Fonds estimated that Taib Mahmud net worth is at least 15 billion US dollars. The United Kingdom, Switzerland, and Germany has since opened investigations on Taib Mahmud's wealth.

Hobbies and interests
In Taib's early days of studying in Australia, he was fond of wearing a designer suit, a hat, and a smoking pipe instead of baju melayu and songkok (traditional Malay attire). Taib later had to tone his western image down to a traditional one in order to keep in touch with his people. Taib also developed an interest in Malay literature and pantuns (Malay poetry). He was also known for being a loyal fan of P. Ramlee, a famous Malaysian singer, actor and director. Taib would occasionally sing a number of P. Ramlee songs in official functions. He would later become a patron of P. Ramlee singing contest in Kuching, Sarawak. Taib also played a major role in Bangsawan, a traditional Malay opera. Taib Mahmud has written and published several Islamic books and other works including "Muhammad and His Mission, Islam and Utility of Mankind", "Freedom of Thought of Islam" and "Appropriate Strategy for Developing Countries in a Period of Resource Scarcity".

Honours
  :
  Commander of the Order of Loyalty to the Crown of Malaysia (PSM) – Tan Sri (1989)
 Grand Commander of the Order of the Defender of the Realm (SMN) – Tun (2014)
  : 
  Commander of the Order of Kinabalu (PGDK) – Datuk (1972)
  : 
  Grand Commander of the Order of Kinabalu (SPDK) – Datuk Seri Panglima (1999)
  :
  Knight Commander of the Order of the Star of Hornbill Sarawak (DA) – Datuk Amar (1974)
  Knight Grand Commander of the Order of the Star of Hornbill Sarawak (DP) – Datuk Patinggi (1981)
  Knight Grand Commander of the Most Exalted Order of the Star of Sarawak (SBS) – Pehin Sri (2003)
  :
  Grand Commander of the Exalted Order of Malacca (DGSM) – Datuk Seri (1988)
  :
  Knight Grand Companion of the Order of Loyalty to the Royal House of Kedah (SSDK) – Dato' Seri (1991)
  :
  Grand Knight of the Order of Sultan Ahmad Shah of Pahang (SSAP) – Dato' Sri (1992)
  :
  Knight Commander of the Order of the Defender of State (DPPN) – Dato' Seri (2005)
  :
  Grand Knight of the Order of the Territorial Crown (SUMW) – Datuk Seri Utama (2008)

Awards and recognitions
In April 2010, he received an honorary doctorate in Leadership from the Limkokwing University of Creative Technology and is recognised as the "Architect of Modern Sarawak" or "Father of Modern Sarawak" by the university.

In July 2010, Taib was presented with the "Lifetime achievement" by Asia HRD Congress to commemorate his contributions towards developing the human capital in Sarawak especially for the establishment of University Malaysia Sarawak (UNIMAS).

In December 2001, he was appointed an Honorary Officer of the Order of Australia, "for service to Australian-Malaysian bilateral relations".

Taib also received honorary degrees from a number of universities, i.e. a Doctor of Science degree from the University of Putra Malaysia (Seri Kembangan, Malaysia) in 1992, a Doctor of the University degree from the University of Adelaide (North Terrace, Australia) in 1994, and a Doctor of Technology degree from Curtin University of Technology (Bentley, Western Australia) in 2000. Furthermore, in 1998, Taib was made the Honorary Fellow of Islamic Academy of Sciences at the Islamic Academy of Sciences (Amman, Jordan).

References

Malaysian billionaires
1936 births
People from Sarawak
Chief Ministers of Sarawak
Sarawak state ministers
Living people
Members of the Dewan Rakyat
Members of the Sarawak State Legislative Assembly
Government ministers of Malaysia
Yang di-Pertua Negeri of Sarawak
Melanau people
Malaysian Muslims
Adelaide Law School alumni
Parti Pesaka Bumiputera Bersatu politicians
Grand Commanders of the Order of the Defender of the Realm
Commanders of the Order of Loyalty to the Crown of Malaysia
Knights Grand Commander of the Most Exalted Order of the Star of Sarawak
Honorary Officers of the Order of Australia
Defence ministers of Malaysia
Second Classes of the Family Order of the Crown of Indra of Pahang
First Classes of the Royal Family Order of Johor
Knights Grand Commander of the Order of the Crown of Johor
Knights Grand Commander of the Order of the Crown of Terengganu
Grand Commanders of the Order of Kinabalu